The Eastern Region is one of the 10 administrative regions in which Venezuela was divided for its development plans; it comprises the states of Anzoátegui, Monagas, and Sucre.

History

The state of Sucre has great historical importance, because it was the first Venezuelan land touched by the Italian navigator, Christopher Columbus. The latter, impressed by the greenness of the flora, the coasts and the crystalline water of its beaches, called the place "Tierra de Gracia". 

While the State of Anzoategui was initially called Province of Barcelona in reference to the Spanish city of the same name, while the capital kept its original name (Barcelona) the territory received the name of a Venezuelan general.

In 1856, the Province of Maturín was created, separated from that of Cumaná. By 1864 the Maturín State was ratified. But in 1879, Monagas was annexed to the State of Oriente and, from 1891 to 1898, it belonged to the State of Bermúdez.

In 1904, Maturín became the capital of the Monagas district of Bermúdez State, whose capital was Cumaná. In 1909, Monagas State was created with its current boundaries.  In honor of General José Tadeo Monagas.

Geography
It is bordered to the north by the Caribbean Sea and the Insular Region; to the south by the state of Bolivar; to the east by the state of Delta Amacuro and the Gulf of Paria; and to the west by the states of Miranda and Guarico.

Demographics
The population of the north-eastern region amounts to 3,316,182 inhabitants, representing 12 per cent of the national population; it is distributed over a territory of 84,000 km2, determining a population density equal to 39.5 inhabitants per km2.

Gallery

Regions of Venezuela